The 2009 Swedish Golf Tour, known as the SAS Masters Tour for sponsorship reasons, was the 24th season of the Swedish Golf Tour, a series of professional golf tournaments for women held in Sweden and Finland.

2009 was the second and final season with Scandinavian Airlines (SAS) as main sponsor, as the airline ran into financial difficulties due to the Great Recession. Purses were reduced and the LET event Göteborg Masters, where 25 places were reserved for players of the tour, was cancelled.

Karin Börjeskog, Hanna-Leena Ronkainen and Anna Rossi all won two events, and Börjeskog won the Order of Merit.

Schedule
The season consisted of 14 tournaments played between May and October, where one event was held in Finland, and one was a Ladies European Tour event.

Order of Merit
An official feeder tour for the Ladies European Tour, the top two finishers in the Order of Merit earned LET cards for 2010.

See also
2009 Swedish Golf Tour (men's tour)

References

External links
Official homepage of the Swedish Golf Tour

Swedish Golf Tour (women)
Swedish Golf Tour (women)